Stemar-13-ene synthase (EC 4.2.3.33, OsDTC2, OsK8, OsKL8, OsKS8, stemarene synthase, syn-stemar-13-ene synthase) is an enzyme with systematic name 9α-copalyl-diphosphate diphosphate-lyase (stemar-13-ene-forming). This enzyme catalyses the following chemical reaction

 9α-copalyl diphosphate  stemar-13-ene + diphosphate

This diterpene cyclase produces stemar-13-ene, a putative precursor of the rice phytoalexin oryzalexin S.

References

External links 
 

EC 4.2.3